Veiqia, or Weniqia, is a female tattooing practice from Fiji. Young women received veiqia at puberty, often as part of a lengthy process. The tattoos were applied by older specialist women known as daubati. Natural materials were used for the inks and to make the tools, some of which were reserved for use on high status women. The practice was prohibited under British colonial rule in the nineteenth century, but has undergone revival in the twenty-first century, led by the work of The Veiqia Project. Whilst there is an important archive of veiqia research at the Fiji Museum, western museum collections hold more artefacts relating to the practice.

Description 
Veiqia is a traditional form of tattooing that was exclusive to women in Fiji. Typically, once young women had passed the age of puberty, they would receive veiqia, often in the groin and on the buttocks - areas that would normally be covered by a liku (fringed skirt), but also close to the mouth. Marking the pubic area is recorded from the village of Nabukeru, on the island of Yasawa. Other regional variations limited the veiqia to only the area covered by a liku, for example in Ba and Rewa; in the highlands of Viti Levu the veiqia extended to the hips, so the marks would be seen above and below the liku.

The veiqia designs were geometric and similar to those printed onto barkcloth or incised onto decorated weapons, such as clubs. The designs are meaningful and express cultural identity through their forms. According to Adolph Brewster veiqia around the mouth could be either "a small elongated circle or ellipse on each side of the mouth" or "a broad sweep around the mouth including the upper lip".

Ritual 
The dauveiqia (also daubati - tattooists) were expert older women, who were held in high regard in Fijian society. The young woman due to be tattooed had to pay the dauveqia in masi, tabua or liku. Preparations for veiqia varied between regions: near the Wainimala river, no preparation was undertaken, but in Noiemalu district the pelvic areas due to be tattooed were rested for three days before, then the skin was massaged prior to marking. In some areas, special caves called qara ni veiqia were used as the location for the ritual. The process could take several weeks, or perhaps months, since it was extremely painful. Only once the veiqia for the groin and the buttocks were finished, were designs around the mouth made. Several days after the veiqia was complete, there was a ceremonial feast.

Implements 
The implements used showed regional variations. In the Noiemalu district on Viti Levu the instrument was called an bati (mbati is an old-fashioned spelling) and was shaped like a very small adze, with the blade made from a lemon tree thorn. A wau (mallet) made from mbeta wood tapped the back of the bati, which punctured the skin. The handle was made from reed. Also on Viti Levu, but in the district of the Wainimala River, a different approach was taken; there, the skin was punctured and ink made from the Acacia richii was then rubbed into the wound. This was in contrast to other methods, where a blade was dipped in the ink. Other materials used to puncture the skin included barracuda or shark teeth, or a sharp-toothed comb made from bone or turtle shell. In Rewasau, the ink was made from the Kauri pine. An ink made from soot from burnt candlenuts was reserved for women of high social status.

Societal significance 
Veiqia was marked onto young women's bodies at the time of puberty, or sometimes at the onset of menstruation. It demonstrated that the women were available for marriage and had physically reached sexual maturity. The veiqia, especially at the mouth, might be altered at other stages of women's lives, such as childbirth - the length of the liku would also be extended. Young women from families of the chief would receive the veiqia and the liku when they were older than those of a lower social status. If a woman died who had not received veiqia, at burial her body was painted with designs so that the gods would not punish her in the afterlife.

Mythology 
According to one Samoan tradition, it was two women from Fiji who travelled there, beginning the practice of malu. Legend states that the women were conjoined twins, Taema and Tilafaiga, who were the daughters of Tokilagafanua, the shark-god, and his sister Hinatuafaga, the Moon. In another version, Taema and Tilafaiga travelled to Fiji, where they learnt the art of tattooing from two men Tufou and Filelei, who told them to "tattoo women, but not men", but on the return journey the twins reversed the phrase, leading a tradition of male tattooing in Samoa.

Colonial period 
With the introduction of Christianity under British colonial rule, the practice was strongly discouraged, with those bearing the designs reportedly victimised. Fijian women were encouraged to adopt "Christian dress". The practice began to become less common from the 1850s onwards. As reported in the Evening News, in 1871 five women were fined ten shillings for "tattooing a woman from the mountains". British colonial administrator, Adolph Brewster, published Hill Tribes of Fiji in 1922, in which he recalled how when he arrived in Rewa and Mbua in 1870, middle-aged and older women were tattooed, but younger women were not. Whilst Brewster described the small elliptical mouth tattoos as "rougeish", he regarded the broader sweeps around the mouth as a "disfigurement".

However, it did continue, in secret, in several remote locations until the early twentieth century. One location was Bua province, where one of the last women to be tattooed was Bu Anaseini Diroko. By 1933, another colonial administrator, George Kingsley Roth wrote that tattooing Fiji was "a past art", although it went on "surreptitiously" in the provinces of Ra and Mathuata.

It is important to also acknowledge that the history and practice of veiqia was largely recorded by people who were not indigenous to Fiji. One example is anthropologist Anne Buckland, who published an article in 1888 which discussed the transmission of tattooing from Fiji to Samoa.

Revival 
In 2015 curators Tarisi Vunidilo and Ema Tavola, alongside artists Joana Monolagi, Donita Hulme, Margaret Aull, Luisa Tora, and Dulcie Stewart (great-granddaughter of Bu Anaseini Diroko), undertook a research project to greater understand veiqia and its personal significance for them. Working as a collective, under the title The Veiqia Project, the group travelled to Suva to examine museum collections and speak to community leaders. Their works were exhibited at the St Paul Street Gallery in Auckland in 2016. In 2017 the collective held an exhibition on veiqia at the Fiji Museum. A further instalment of the collective's work, curated by Luisa Tora, was exhibited in Christchurch in 2021, and was entitled iLakolako ni weniqia: a Veiqia Project Exhibition.

The work of The Veiqia Project has sparked a revival interest in the tattooing practice, and a number of younger Fijian women in particular are adopting the veiqia. Modern dauveiqia include Julia Mage’au Gray.

Museum collections 
During the nineteenth century, liku and records of veiqia began to be collected by non-Fijians. As anthropologist Karen Jacobs has observed "the tattooed body is hard to collect". The largest record of veiqia was made by Anatole von Hügel, who became the first curator of the Museum of Archaeology and Anthropology in Cambridge, where the archive is held. Whilst von Hügel made drawings in the field, Fijian women also drew and recorded veiqia for him. Through careful comparison of archival drawings and von Hügel's notebooks, objects and drawings have been connected with the names of women whose veiqia were recorded. One woman, Laniana, whose veiqia are recorded, also travelled with von Hügel from 1875-76.

In 1981, director of the Fiji Museum, Fergus Clunie, and his colleague Walesi Ligairi, recorded the veiqia of five eighty-year old women at Vanua Levu. The women were all tattooed between 1908 and 1911 by Rabali, who was known as the "last daubauti". The women chose to be anonymised once the record of their veiqia was created, in order to spare their families from embarrassment.

The South Australia Museum has bati (tattooing instruments) in its collection. Other museums which have also collected similar material include the Auckland Museum; the Pitt Rivers Museum; and the Peabody Essex Museum.

References

External links 

 Radio NZ: The Traditional Fijian Female Tattooing Practice of Veiqia

Fijian culture
Tattooing traditions
Tattooing
Fijian women